Masaru Yanagida (born 17 November 1969 by 柳田勝) is a Japanese sport shooter who competed in the 1992 Summer Olympics, in the 1996 Summer Olympics, in the 2000 Summer Olympics and in the 2004 Summer Olympics.

References

1969 births
Living people
Japanese male sport shooters
ISSF rifle shooters
Olympic shooters of Japan
Shooters at the 1992 Summer Olympics
Shooters at the 1996 Summer Olympics
Shooters at the 2000 Summer Olympics
Shooters at the 2004 Summer Olympics
Shooters at the 1990 Asian Games
Shooters at the 1994 Asian Games
Shooters at the 1998 Asian Games
Shooters at the 2002 Asian Games
Asian Games medalists in shooting
Asian Games gold medalists for Japan
Asian Games silver medalists for Japan
Asian Games bronze medalists for Japan
Medalists at the 1990 Asian Games
Medalists at the 1994 Asian Games
Medalists at the 1998 Asian Games
Medalists at the 2002 Asian Games
20th-century Japanese people
21st-century Japanese people